Savè is a city in Benin, lying on the Cotonou-Parakou railway and the main north–south road. It is known for its local boulders, popular with climbers. "Savè" is from the historical Yoruba name Ṣábẹ̀ẹ́.

The commune covers an area of 2228 square kilometres and as of 2002 had a population of 67,753 people.

History
On the 30th of January 1894 there was a treaty for French protectorate status between Brigadier General Alfred-Amédée Dodds, the commander superior of French establishments in Benin and Oba Akenmu, King of the Confederation of Nago Tchabè. Subsequently in 1903, due to disagreements, the Oba (Onichabe) tried to shift the Anglo-French border delineation westwards from the Okpara river to the Weme river in order to integrate the Shabe territory beginning at the north of Tchatchou into the same colonial authority as that of the Oyo and the Egba to the east under British Nigeria. For this, the Oba was arrested and served a one year jail term. He was later deported to Porto-Novo in 1902-1911.

In 1922, a small building served as a chapel for the Protestant Methodist mission in "Anu Abata" located in front of the Royal Palace and then later on,  the estate currently housing the Salem Temple of Savè donated by Oba Akenmu. In 1924 the first catholic missionaries arrived.

Transport 

Savè is served by a station of the Benin Railways system.

See also 

 Railway stations in Benin

References 

Communes of Benin
Populated places in the Collines Department